Heather Cox Richardson is an American historian and professor of history at Boston College, where she teaches courses on the American Civil War, the Reconstruction Era, the American West, and the Plains Indians. She previously taught history at MIT and the University of Massachusetts Amherst.

Richardson has authored six books on history and politics. In 2014, Richardson founded a popular history website, werehistory.org. Between 2017 and 2018, she co-hosted the NPR podcast Freak Out and Carry On. Most recently, Richardson started publishing "Letters from an American", a nightly newsletter that chronicles current events in the larger context of American history. The newsletter accrued tens of thousands of subscribers, making her, as of December 2020, the most successful individual author of a paid publication on Substack. Richardson also co-hosts the podcast Now & Then with fellow historian Joanne B. Freeman. In February 2022, Richardson interviewed President Joe Biden.

Early life and education
Born in 1962 and raised in Maine, Richardson attended Phillips Exeter Academy in Exeter, New Hampshire. She received both her B.A. and Ph.D. from Harvard University, where she studied under David Herbert Donald and William Gienapp.

Writing career

The Greatest Nation of the Earth (1997)
Richardson’s first book, The Greatest Nation of the Earth (1997), stemmed from her dissertation at Harvard University. Inspired by Eric Foner’s work on pre-Civil War Republican ideology, Richardson analyzed Republican economic policies during the war. She contended that their efforts to create an activist federal government during the Civil War marked a continuation of Republican free labor ideology. These policies, such as war bonds and greenbacks or the Land Grant College Act and the Homestead Act, revolutionized the role of the federal government in the U.S. economy. At the same time, these actions laid the groundwork for the Republican Party's shift to big business after the Civil War.

According to Professor James L. Huston at Oklahoma State University: For nineteenth-century political historians, this will be an important book with crucial insights into the nature of the Republican Party. Richardson's attention to political economy offers a refreshing vantage point from which to assess Civil War legislation, and her willingness to delve deeply into economic doctrines is commendable. Not the least of her accomplishments is a more realistic appraisal of the Republicans, revealing their agricultural bias and their distrust of monopoly and hierarchy.... At times, Richardson's discussion of economic principles is insightful and perceptive; at other times the discussion is shallow and requires more refinement.

The Death of Reconstruction (2001)
Four years later, Richardson extended her study of Republican policy into the postwar period with The Death of Reconstruction (2001). Unlike other historians, her analysis of the period focused on the "Northern abandonment of Reconstruction". Building on the earlier work of C. Vann Woodward, she argued that a more complete understanding of the period required appreciation of class, not only race. As Reconstruction continued into the 1870s and especially the 1880s, Republicans began to view African Americans in the South more from a class perspective and less from the perspective of race that had driven their earlier humanitarianism. In the midst of the labor struggles of the Gilded Age, Republicans came to compare "the demands of the ex-slaves for land, social services, and civil rights" to the demands of white laborers in the North. This ideological shift was the key to Republican abandonment of Reconstruction, as they chose the protection of their economic and business interests over their desire for racial equality.

According to Professor Michael W. Fitzgerald, at St. Olaf College: "The Death of Reconstruction" is an important book on a big topic. It offers  a full-scale reinterpretation of the great betrayal of the Civil War's egalitarian legacy, the northern public's abandonment of the freedpeople. If the book is not uniformly persuasive, that partially reflects the scope of its ambition.

West from Appomattox (2007)
In West from Appomattox: The Reconstruction of America after the Civil War (2007), Richardson presented Reconstruction as a national event that affected all Americans, not just those in the South. She incorporated the West into the discussion of Reconstruction as no predecessor had. Between 1865 and 1900, Americans re-imagined the role of the federal government, calling upon it to promote the well-being of its citizens. However, racism, sexism, and greed divided Americans, and the same people who increasingly benefited from government intervention—white, middle-class Americans—actively excluded African-Americans, Native Americans, immigrants, and organized laborers from the newfound bounties of their reconstructed nation.

Wounded Knee (2010)
Wounded Knee: Party Politics and the Road to an American Massacre (2010), focused on the U.S. Army's slaughter of Native Americans in South Dakota in 1890. She argued that party politics and opportunism led to the Wounded Knee Massacre. After a bruising midterm election, President Benjamin Harrison needed to shore up his support. To do so, he turned to The Dakotas, where he replaced seasoned Indian agents with unqualified political allies, who incorrectly assumed that the Ghost Dance Movement presaged war. In order to avoid spending cuts from Congress, the army responded by sending one-third of its force. After the event, Republicans tried to paint the massacre as a heroic battle to stifle the resurgent Democrats.

To Make Men Free (2014)
In To Make Men Free: A History of the Republican Party (2014), Richardson extended her study of the Republican Party into the twentieth and twenty-first centuries. This book studied the entire life of the Republican Party, from its inception in the 1850s through the presidency of George W. Bush. Believing a small group of men who controlled all three branches of government were turning the country into a slavocracy, the party’s founders united against "slave power". These Republicans articulated a new vision of an America in which all hardworking men could rise. But after the Civil War, Republicans began to emulate what they originally opposed. They tied themselves to powerful bankers and industrialists, sacrificing the well-being of ordinary Americans. A similar process took place after World War II, when Republicans sought to dismantle successful New Deal policies and prop up the wealthy. However, in both cases, reformers within the party were able to return the party to its founding vision of equality of opportunity, first Theodore Roosevelt during the Progressive Era, and then Dwight D. Eisenhower, who enforced integration and maintained the New Deal. 

The Nixon and Reagan administrations represented yet another fall from the party's founding purpose. It is ironic, Richardson points out, that Republicans treated Barack Obama with an unprecedented level of disrespect, as Obama's rise from humble beginnings to the highest office in the nation embodied the vision of the original Republicans. In a new afterword, Richardson also points out the irony of one of the rioters storming the Capitol carrying the Confederate flag on  January 6, 2021, despite the Republican Party starting in the 1850s as a popular movement against the men who would lead the Confederate States of America.

How the South Won the Civil War (2020)
In How the South Won the Civil War: Oligarchy, Democracy, and the Continuing Fight for the Soul of America (2020), Richardson argued that America was founded with contradicting ideals, with the ideas of liberty, equality, and opportunity on one hand, and slavery and hierarchy on the other. United States victory in the American Civil War should have settled that tension forever, but at the same time that the Civil War was fought, Americans also started moving into the West. In the West, Americans found, and expanded upon, deep racial hierarchies, meaning that hierarchical values survived in American politics and culture despite the crushing defeat of the pro-slavery Confederacy. Those traditions—a rejection of democracy, an embrace of entrenched wealth, the marginalization of women and people of color—have found a home in modern conservative politics, leaving the promise of America unfulfilled. Professor Dana Elizabeth Weiner of Wilfrid Laurier University states:With this beautifully written book, prominent US historian Heather Cox Richardson offers valuable insights to historians and general readers about the tenacity of oligarchy in American politics since the seventeenth century.
Deborah M. Liles, a professor at Tarleton State University states:  Heather Cox Richardson's skill with connecting events into a cohesive narrative is on full display in this brilliant study....she dismantles the concept of equality guaranteed in the Constitution, connects western ideology with that of the Old South, and demonstrates how oligarchs and those who supported them established restrictions within society to retain their power.

Newsletter 
In September 2019, Richardson began writing a daily synopsis of political events associated with the impeachment inquiry of President Donald Trump. Originally posted late every evening or in the early hours of the next day on her Facebook page, Richardson later moved to add a newsletter format, entitled "Letters from an American", published via Substack. The newsletter became popular because of her calm voice, with straightforward explanations of the news of the day. As of December 2020, Richardson was "the most successful individual author of a paid publication on ... Substack" and on track to bring in a million dollars of revenue a year. The newsletter received a "Best of Boston" award for "2021 Best Pandemic Newsletter" from Boston magazine.

Awards and honors 

 USA Today's Women of the Year for 2022

Works
 The Greatest Nation of the Earth: Republican Economic Policies during the Civil War (Harvard University Press, 1997) 
 The Death of Reconstruction: Race, Labor, and Politics in the Post-Civil War North, 1865-1901 (Harvard University Press, 2001) 
 "A Marshall Plan for the South?: The Failure of Republican and Democratic Ideology during Reconstruction." Civil War History 51.4 (2005): 378-387. online

 West from Appomattox: The Reconstruction of America after the Civil War (Yale University Press, 2007) 
 "Abraham Lincoln and the Politics of Principle." Marquette Law Review 93 (2009): 1383+ online.

 Wounded Knee: Party Politics and the Road to an American Massacre (Basic Books, 2010)  
 To Make Men Free: A History of the Republican Party (Basic Books, 2014)  
 How the South Won the Civil War: Oligarchy, Democracy, and the Continuing Fight for the Soul of America (Oxford University Press, 2020)

References

Further reading
 Benedict, Michael Les. "Review: Ideology and Politics in the Gilded Age and Progressive Era" Journal of the Gilded Age and Progressive Era (2003) 2#2 pp. 218-230.

External links

 Facebook page with links to Letters to America and taped bi-weekly history lectures
 Letters from an American with free and paid subscription options

20th-century American historians
20th-century American women writers
21st-century American historians
21st-century American women writers
American women historians
Harvard College alumni
Historians from Maine
Historians of the United States
Living people
Phillips Exeter Academy alumni
Year of birth missing (living people)
Political science educators
Boston College faculty
Harvard Graduate School of Arts and Sciences alumni